Mangalmé is a city in the Guéra Region, Chad. It is the administrative center of the Mangalmé Departament.

Population
Population by years:

References

Populated places in Chad